Wachs is a German surname, also common among Ashkenazi Jews, meaning "wax". Notable people with the surname include:
Caitlin Wachs (born 1989), American actress
Daliah Wachs, American radio personality
Dana Wachs (born 1957), American lawyer and politician
Daniel Alfred Wachs (born 1976), American musician
David Wachs (born 1980), American actor and musician
Joel Wachs (born 1939), American politician
Judith Wachs (c. 1938–2008), American singer and songwriter
Larry Wachs, American radio host
Martin Wachs, American professor of engineering and planning 
Michelle L. Wachs, American mathematician
Murray Wachs, pseudonym: Bingo Gazingo (1924–2010), American poet
Paul Wachs, French composer
Ruby Wachs, now Ruby Wax (born 1953), American comedian
Theodore Wachs (born 1941), American psychologists

See also

Wach (surname)
Wax (surname)
Wachs Arena, multi-purpose arena in Aberdeen, South Dakota, United States
Newman Wachs Racing, auto racing team

German-language surnames
Jewish surnames